Argo was launched at Whitby in 1807 as a West Indiaman. She made one voyage to India under a license from the British East India Company (EIC). Thereafter she traded between Liverpool and Miramichi, New Brunswick. She  was last listed in 1824 and may have foundered in June 1824.

Career
Argo first appeared in Lloyd's Register (LR) in 1807.

In 1813 the EIC had lost its monopoly on the trade between India and Britain. British ships were then free to sail to India or the Indian Ocean under a license from the EIC. In 1817 Argo sailed for Bengal under a license from the EIC. On 27 June 1817 Captain W.Barclay sailed Argo for Fort William, India. Argo sailed from Bengal on 7 March 1818 and arrived off Margate on 23 July.

Fate
Argo was last listed in LR in 1824. An Argo, of Glasgow, foundered in June 1824 in the Atlantic Ocean with the loss of four of her crew. , of Whitby, rescued the surviving crew and passengers and brought them into Miramichi.

Citations and references
Citations

References
 
 

1807 ships
Ships built in Whitby
Age of Sail merchant ships of England
Maritime incidents in 1824